Abdul Lateef Azmi (also written as Abdul Latif Azmi - 1917–2002) was an Urdu litterateur and among the close associates of the founders of Jamia Millia Islamia. He joined Jamia Millia as a student of B.A. in 1936 and served the university over 50 years in various capacities. He was one of the longest serving editors of Jamia Millia's official magazine, Jamia. He died in Delhi on May 11, 2002. In 1985, Maktaba Jamia, New Delhi, published a book Abdul Lateef Azmi Hayat-o-Khidmat. Several scholars contributed chapters in the book on various facets of Abdul Lateef Azmi and his life.

Biography 
Abdul Lateef Azmi was born to Abdul Samad and Sabira Khatoon on March 1, 1917. He belonged to a landed family of village Bandi Kalan, District Azamgarh, UP. His father Abdul Samad expired 6 months before he was born, and his mother died when he was just a year old. He was raised by his uncle Abdul Hai. He was sent to Madrasatul Islah and later he joined Darul Uloom Nadwatul Ulama, Lucknow from where he completed his traditional education. After Nadwatul Ulama, he joined Jamia Millia Islamia in 1936 as a student of B.A. He joined MA (Arabic) at Aligarh Muslim University in 1955 but could not complete the course owing to his poor health. Later, he completed M.A. (Urdu) from Jamia Millia Islamia in 1975.

Professional associations 

 In charge of the Department of Research, writing and publications, Maktaba Jamia, Delhi: 1941-44
 Additionally in charge of Kutub Khana: Jamia, Delhi: 1945-1948
 Deputy Manager: Hamdarda-ne-Jamia, New Delhi 1952-1954
 Personal Assistant: Mohammad Mujeeb, Vice Chancellor, Jamia Millia Islamia, New Delhi, 1955-1972 
 Secretary, Vice Chancellor, Jamia Millia Islamia, New Delhi, 1972–1979
 Assistant Editorial, Zakir Husain Institute of Islamic Studies, Jamia Millia Islamia, New Delhi 1979:1984

Journalistic works 

 Assistant editor, Monthly, Jamia, Maktaba Jamia Delhi 1943-1944
 Assistant editor, Weekly, Nai Roshni, New Delhi 1948-1952
 Editor, Monthly, Hamdard-e-Jamia, New Delhi 1952-1954
 Editor, Subah, Anjuman Taraqi-e-Urdu, Delhi Branch 1965-1977
 Editor, Monthly Jamia, Jamia Millia Islamia, New Delhi 1961-1964
 Assistant editor, Monthly Jamia, Jamia Millia Islamia, New Delhi 1964-1984

Books 
 Socialism (1942)
 Maulana Shibli Ka Martaba aur Urdu Adab (1945)
 Dr Azkir Hussain: Seerat Wa Shakhsiyat (1967: Republished in 2011: ISBN 9788175876378)
 Jawahar Lal Nehru: Ek Muta'ala (1968)
 Gandhiji aur Unke Khayalaat (1970)
 Baba-e-Urdu Maulvi Abdul Haque (1971)
 Sir Syed Ahmad Khan Aur Unki Manwiyat Maujooda Daur Mein (1972)
 Maulana Muhammad Ali Jauhar: Aik Mutaliya (1980)
 Dr Rajendra Prasad: Azeem Qaumi Rehnuma aur Pehle Rashtrapati (1999)

Book translations 

 Jamhuriat ki Kamyabi men Americi Adalat-e-Aliya Ke Shandar Karname. (Authored by R. Rama Swami: 1956)
 Bharat Aaj aur Kal (Authored by Jawahra Lal Nehru: 1962)

Awards and recognitions 

 UP Government Award for his work on M.K. Gandhi and his thoughts: 1974
 UP Urdu Academy Award for his work, "Iqbal Dana-e-Raaz": 1979
 Ministry of Adult Education, Government of India Award for his work on 3rd President of India Dr Zakir Husain: 1979
 West Bengal Urdu Academy Award for his work on Maulana Mohammad Ali: 1981
 Mohammad Ali Jauhar Award from Jauhar Memorial Society Lucknow, UP 1981

References 

1917 births
2002 deaths
Indian writers
People from Azamgarh district
Jamia Millia Islamia
Urdu-language writers from India